Yordan Ivanov (born 22 March 1932) is a Bulgarian equestrian. He competed in two events at the 1972 Summer Olympics.

References

External links
 

1932 births
Living people
Bulgarian male equestrians
Olympic equestrians of Bulgaria
Equestrians at the 1972 Summer Olympics
People from Plovdiv Province
20th-century Bulgarian people